Wrong Again is a 1929 American two-reel silent comedy film directed by Leo McCarey and starring Laurel and Hardy. It was filmed in October and November 1928, and released February 23, 1929, by Metro-Goldwyn-Mayer. Although a silent film, it was released with a synchronized music and sound-effects track in theaters equipped for sound.

Plot 
Stable grooms Laurel and Hardy overhear news of a $5,000 reward for the return of the stolen painting The Blue Boy, but think the reward is for the horse at their barn named Blue Boy. The police eventually recover the Blue Boy painting and are making plans to return it. When the grooms bring the horse to the painting's owner, he speaks to them from an upstairs window where he can't see the steed; he tells them to bring Blue Boy into the house.

The three come clumping through the front door while the millionaire upstairs takes a bath. Ollie has an altercation with a nude statue, which snaps into three pieces after the two tumble to the floor; Hardy safeguards the statue's modesty by wrapping its bare torso in his coat while he reassembles it. When the statue's back upright and Ollie removes the coat, the torso segment is backwards, so its backside protrudes out from where its midriff should be.

The millionaire calls down from upstairs, "Put him on top of the piano". Working together, the boys manage to lead the horse over to the grand piano, and up he leaps to his high perch. Things seem fine, when suddenly a piano leg gives way and Ollie is left holding things up. During all this, the horse keeps on trying to knock Stan's hat off, often succeeding.

The millionaire's mother returns home, the police arrive with the real Blue Boy, the recovered painting, and the refreshed millionaire descends from his bath, whereupon the misunderstanding is revealed. Ollie apologizes for the "faux pas", and he, Stan and Blue Boy make a hasty exit, followed by the irate millionaire with a shotgun. In the process, the priceless painting gets knocked to the floor on top of one of the detectives.

Cast

Production notes
Wrong Again contains a sight gag unknown to modern audiences. When the team first bring their equine meal ticket into the house, Stan lifts the lid off an urn, ties Blue Boy's rein to it and drops it on the floor. 1929 audiences would laugh at this, as the insubstantial lid is a visual dead ringer for a horse anchor, an item still common in 1929. Drivers of horse-drawn wagons making deliveries would literally "drop anchor" while they ran their delivery into a house; the horse would be discouraged from wandering by the 25-pound weight of the anchor. This is not the only appearance of a horse anchor in a Laurel and Hardy film: they also have one at the ready in their Model T in the 1934 short Going Bye-Bye! to discourage the car from wandering away.

The working title of Wrong Again was Just the Reverse, a reference to the 180-degree hand-twist gesture that is a running gag throughout the film. Laurel and Hardy historian Randy Skretvedt writes that the gesture was a running gag around the Hal Roach Studios: creative sparkplug Leo McCarey would remind the writers that a dramatic episode could be infused with comedy by applying just a twist to make it funny. The gesture became a staple of writer-to-writer communication around the studio.

The stable scenes were shot at a Los Angeles sports complex, polo field and ranch known as The Uplifters in Rustic Canyon.

Critical response 
Wrong Again is one of the several silent Laurel and Hardy short films that were made with a synchronized music and sound effects track; after its initial theatrical run in 1929, it was rarely seen, and was overshadowed by the sound films. It would eventually be available in a home-edition 8mm or 16mm film, and, as such, almost always without its soundtrack.

Critic William K. Everson was among the first to cast a critical eye on the Laurel and Hardy films. Writing of Wrong Again in 1967, "An off-beat comedy that can only be seen at a disadvantage now in that it was made as both a silent and limited sound release, and undoubtedly paced for sound. Today [1967] only the silent version survives, and at times seems awkward and unsure of itself. Nevertheless, it has some very funny moments.... There is a semi-surrealistic quality to many of the sight gags in Wrong Again."

Silent film authority Bruce Calvert commented, "This entertaining film is one of Laurel and Hardy's most bizarre," while prolific critic Leslie Halliwell takes the opposite stand: "Pleasing but not very inventive star comedy."

Glenn Mitchell added Wrong Again is among the most original Laurel and Hardy comedies, its gags alternately bizarre, risqué and imaginative knockabout.... The best copies of Wrong Again incorporate a restored disc accompaniment from the original release. The skilled orchestral arrangement and appropriate sound effects transform the film into a minor masterpiece, reminding modern audiences of the way silent films were presented at their zenith."

References

External links 

1929 films
1929 comedy films
American silent short films
American black-and-white films
Films directed by Leo McCarey
Laurel and Hardy (film series)
Metro-Goldwyn-Mayer short films
Films with screenplays by H. M. Walker
1920s English-language films
1920s American films
Silent American comedy films